Lauritsala is a former Finnish market town in the South Karelia region. It was closed down on 1 January 1967 and was incorporated into Lappeenranta. The present district of Lauritsala comprises only the center of the former town.

History 

Lauritsala was originally one of the villages of the Lappee parish. It has existed at least since 1558, when it was mentioned as Lawritzala. Its name is derived from the surname Lauritsainen, which in turn is derived from the name of Saint Lawrence. Lauritsala became an independent municipality in 1932. 

The former Lauritsala market area had 12,965 inhabitants in 1966. It is home to UPM-Kymmene's Kaukas mills and part of the Saimaa Canal.

The center of Lappeenranta is about four kilometres away. There are old detached houses and blocks of flats in the area, with new settlements. In 1960, Lauritsala's population density included Mustola (341 inhabitants, partly on the Lappee side) and Mälki (322 inhabitants).

The Lappeenranta and Lauritsala population centres had grown together and are now called Lappeenranta centre, with 32,174 inhabitants in 1960. In addition, part of the Laihia settlement in Lappee municipality extended to Lauritsala.

Notable people 
 Seppo Ahokainen, Finnish professional ice hockey player
 Teuvo Kohonen, Finnish researcher, best known for the development of self-organizing map
 Arvi Lind, Finnish television news presenter
 Eino Valle, Finnish long-distance runner

Places and events 
 Lauritsala Church
 Lauritsala's library was described by L. R. McColvin (City Librarian at Westminster, London)  as: "the most attractive, most beautiful small library I have ever seen in the world."

References

Further reading

External links 
 Documenta Carelica Portal
 Lauritsala township exhibition Museum of South Karelia (in Finnish)
 So just 35 years - that's how the legendary Lauritsala has changed Yle News (in Finnish)
 Lauritsala library (in Finnish)

 
Cities and towns in Finland
Populated places established in 1937
 
History of Karelia